Agglo Pays d'Issoire is the communauté d'agglomération, an intercommunal structure, centred on the town of Issoire. It is located in the Puy-de-Dôme department, in the Auvergne-Rhône-Alpes region, central France. Created in 2017, its seat is in Issoire. Its area is 1,017.9 km2. Its population was 56,851 in 2019, of which 15,296 in Issoire proper.

Composition
The communauté d'agglomération consists of the following 88 communes:

Antoingt
Anzat-le-Luguet
Apchat
Ardes
Augnat
Aulhat-Flat
Auzat-la-Combelle
Bansat
Beaulieu
Bergonne
Boudes
Brassac-les-Mines
Brenat
Le Breuil-sur-Couze
Le Broc
Chadeleuf
Chalus
Champagnat-le-Jeune
Champeix
La Chapelle-Marcousse
La Chapelle-sur-Usson
Charbonnier-les-Mines
Chassagne
Chidrac
Clémensat
Collanges
Coudes
Courgoul
Dauzat-sur-Vodable
Égliseneuve-des-Liards
Esteil
Gignat
Grandeyrolles
Issoire
Jumeaux
Lamontgie
Ludesse
Madriat
Mareugheol
Mazoires
Meilhaud
Montaigut-le-Blanc
Montpeyroux
Moriat
Neschers
Nonette-Orsonnette
Orbeil
Pardines
Parent
Parentignat
Perrier
Peslières
Plauzat
Les Pradeaux
Rentières
Roche-Charles-la-Mayrand
Saint-Alyre-ès-Montagne
Saint-Babel
Saint-Cirgues-sur-Couze
Saint-Étienne-sur-Usson
Saint-Floret
Saint-Genès-la-Tourette
Saint-Germain-Lembron
Saint-Gervazy
Saint-Hérent
Saint-Jean-en-Val
Saint-Jean-Saint-Gervais
Saint-Martin-des-Plains
Saint-Martin-d'Ollières
Saint-Quentin-sur-Sauxillanges
Saint-Rémy-de-Chargnat
Saint-Vincent
Saint-Yvoine
Saurier
Sauvagnat-Sainte-Marthe
Sauxillanges
Solignat
Sugères
Ternant-les-Eaux
Tourzel-Ronzières
Usson
Valz-sous-Châteauneuf
Varennes-sur-Usson
Le Vernet-Chaméane
Verrières
Vichel
Villeneuve
Vodable

References

Issoire
Issoire